Henri Kontinen and Frederik Nielsen won the final against Jordan Kerr and Ken Skupski 6–2, 6–4.

Seeds

Draw

Draw

References
 Doubles Draw

Aegon Pro-Series Loughborough - Doubles
Sport in Loughborough
2010 in English sport
2010 Doubles